Footloose industry is a general term for an industry that can be placed and located at any location without effect from factors of production such as resources, land, labour, and capital.

These industries often have spatially fixed costs, which means that the costs of the products do not change despite where the product is assembled. Diamonds, computer chips, and mobile manufacturing are some examples of footloose industries. These are generally non-polluting industries.

Non-footloose industries generally require raw material availability within a time limit to make products.
Sugar industry, jute industry and tea industry are the examples of non-footloose industries.

Footloose industries can also refer to the processing of products that are neither weight-gaining, nor weight-losing, and face significant transportation costs. An example of a footloose processing industry is honey. The weight of the raw honey and wax is the same as the finishing product. So, whether the honey is processed near the source of the raw materials or at the location of the final product demand, the transportation costs are the same.

References

Economic geography